Tricarpelema glanduliferum is a monocotyledonous herbaceous plant in the family Commelinaceae. It is known from only two collections from India and Vietnam respectively. The species is distinctive within the genus due to its small leaves and the dense glandular hairs found on the inflorescences.

References 

glanduliferum
Flora of Arunachal Pradesh
Flora of Vietnam
Plants described in 1969